The 7th Army Aviation Regiment "Vega" is an Italian Army regiment based at Rimini Airport in the Emilia Romagna. The regiment is part of the army aviation and assigned to the Airmobile Brigade "Friuli". The regiment, together with the 5th Army Aviation Regiment "Rigel", constitutes the Italian Army's combat aviation and tactical lift capability.

History

Formation 
On 5 July 1996 the 7th Attack Helicopters Regiment "Vega" was formed at Casarsa Airport with personnel and materiel ceded by the 5th Army Aviation Regiment "Rigel". The regiment also received the 55th Multirole Helicopters Squadrons Group "Dragone" from the Northeastern Military Region and the 44th Army Aviation Squadrons Group "Fenice" from the 4th Army Aviation Regiment "Altair". Upon entering the 7th Attack Helicopters Regiment the 44th Squadrons Group was renamed 48th Attack Helicopters Squadrons Group "Pavone". The regiment was assigned to the 5th Army Corps and consisted of the following units:

  7th Attack Helicopters Regiment "Vega", at Casarsa Airport
 48th Attack Helicopters Squadrons Group "Pavone", at Belluno Airport
 Command and Services Squadron
 481st Attack Helicopters Squadron (A129A Mangusta attack helicopters)
 482nd Attack Helicopters Squadron (A129A Mangusta attack helicopters)
 49th Attack Helicopters Squadrons Group "Capricorno", at Casarsa Airport
 Command and Services Squadron
 491st Attack Helicopters Squadron (A129A Mangusta attack helicopters)
 492nd Attack Helicopters Squadron (A129A Mangusta attack helicopters)
 55th Multirole Helicopters Squadrons Group "Dragone", at Padua Airport
 Command and Services Squadron
 551st Multirole Helicopters Squadron (AB 204B/205 helicopters)
 552nd Multirole Helicopters Squadron (AB 204B/205 helicopters)
 Support Squadrons Group, at Casarsa Airport
 Logistic Support Squadron
 Aircraft Maintenance Squadron

On 1 September 1996 the 55th Multirole Helicopters Squadrons Group "Dragone" was reduced to 551st Army Aviation Squadron "Dragone". On 1 July 1998 the 551st Army Aviation Squadron "Dragone" was reorganized as SOATCC Group ( - Tactical Anti-Aircraft Sighting and Army Aviation Control Subsystem) and transferred to the Aviation Inspectorate.

Naming 
Since the 1975 Army reform Italian army aviation units are named for celestial objects: regiments are numbered with a single digit and named for stars in the 88 modern constellationss. Accordingly, an army aviation regiment's coat of arms highlights the name-giving star within its constellation. Squadron groups were numbered with two digits and named for constellations, or planets of the Solar System. The 7th Army Aviation Regiment was named for Vega the brightest star in the Lyra constellation.

On 15 July 1996 the President of the Italian Republic Oscar Luigi Scalfaro granted the regiment its flag, which has since been awarded a Military Order of Italy for the regiment's participation in international missions in Albania, Kosovo, Iraq, and Afghanistan, and one Bronze Medal of Army Valour awarded to the then autonomous 48th Reconnaissance Helicopters Squadrons Group "Pavone" for its service after the 1976 Friuli earthquake.

Recent times 
On 1 September 1998 the 7th Attack Helicopters Regiment "Vega" transferred the 48th Attack Helicopters Squadrons Group "Pavone" to the 5th Army Aviation Regiment "Rigel", which moved on the same date to the former Italian Air Force Miramare Air Base near Rimini. On 23 October of the same year the Vega was renamed 7th Army Aviation Regiment "Vega" and swapped name and flags with the 5th Army Aviation Regiment "Rigel". Based now at Miramare Air Base the Vega consisted of the 25th Army Aviation Squadrons Group "Cigno", 48th Attack Helicopters Squadrons Group "Pavone", 53rd Army Aviation Squadrons Group "Cassiopea", and Support Squadrons Group. On 1 January 1999 the regiment entered the Mechanized Brigade "Friuli", which was in the process of reforming as airmobile brigade. On 5 May 2000 the 5th Army Aviation Regiment "Rigel" joined the Mechanized Brigade "Friuli", which on that date changed its name to Airmobile Brigade "Friuli". In 2008 the Vega began the transition from AB 204B/205 to NH90 helicopters. On 31 December 2015 the 53rd Squadrons Group "Cassiopea" was disbanded.

Current Structure 

As of 2022 the 7th Army Aviation Regiment "Vega" consists of:

  7th Army Aviation Regiment "Vega", at Rimini Airport
 Headquarters Unit
 25th Squadrons Group "Cigno"
 251st Combat Support Helicopters Squadron
 252nd Combat Support Helicopters Squadron
 253rd Combat Support Helicopters Squadron
 48th Squadrons Group "Pavone"
 481st Attack Helicopters Squadron
 482nd Attack Helicopters Squadron
 483rd Attack Helicopters Squadron
 Support Squadrons Group
 Logistic Support Squadron
 Aircraft Maintenance Squadron

Equipment 
The 25th Squadrons Group "Cigno" is equipped with NH90 transport helicopters and the 48th Squadrons Group "Pavone" with A129D Mangusta attack helicopters.

See also 
 Army Aviation

External links
Italian Army Website: 7° Reggimento Aviazione dell'Esercito "Vega"

References

Army Aviation Regiments of Italy